The Battle of Arkansas Post, also known as Colbert's Raid or the Colbert Raid, was a minor battle of the American Revolutionary War fought at Arkansas Post on April 17, 1783. It was a part of a series of small engagements fought between Spanish and British forces in the Lower Mississippi region from 1779, when Spain entered the war on the side of the United States. It consisted of an attack on the Spanish-controlled post by Loyalist irregulars led by James Colbert. 

The battle's primary engagement was a six-hour siege of the post's fort and a subsequent sortie by the Spanish defenders, causing the Loyalist irregulars and their Chickasaw allies to rout. The battle actually took place three months after the preliminary treaty between Spain and Britain was signed on January 20, but word of the treaty had not yet reached the Lower Mississippi region. It was the only American Revolutionary War battle fought in the present-day state of Arkansas.

Background
In the years prior to the battle, Spanish forces had won several victories in the Lower Mississippi region, driving out the British from Manchac and Baton Rouge and taking numerous prisoners of war. By 1783, British forces in the region were severely scattered, almost non-existent, and consisted only of small irregular groups engaged in guerrilla warfare. A former British Army captain, James Colbert, was a leader of one such group, managing to rally a small number of ragtag fellow loyalists to continue the fight against the Spanish. 

Colbert's primary target was Arkansas Post because of its strategic location at the confluence of the Arkansas and Mississippi rivers, and he had been planning an attack on the Spanish trading post for about a year. If the post could be captured, Colbert and his fighters could easily harass Spanish traffic on the Mississippi without consequence. The post was inhabited by a small garrison of 33 Spanish Army soldiers of the Louisiana Regiment and four Quapaw warriors in addition to the post's commander, Jacobo du Breuil, the second-in-command, Lieutenant Luis de Villars, and Sergeant Alexo Pastor. It was guarded by a simple stockade fort, Fort Carlos III, half a mile upriver.

Prelude
In early April, Colbert and his flotilla set off from their encampment on the Wolf River. On the Mississippi, Colbert's party encountered American vessels headed downriver to Natchez for settlement. These settlers were ordered to land and wait ashore for six days. Further down, near the mouth of the White River, Colbert encountered trading vessels from both New Orleans and Arkansas Post. These were seized along with their goods. The flotilla then proceeded up the Arkansas river. 

Not far from the post, on April 16, Colbert ordered several Chickasaw to scout ahead.  These scouts encountered the Quapaw village, Osotouy. Here they told the local chief, Angaska, who was allied to the Spanish and regularly corresponded with Dubreuil, that they were only going upriver "with a dozen Americans to shake hands with Captain Dubreuil.” They then presented the chief with rum as a gift. As a result of this deception, Angaska did not report upriver to Dubreuil that anything was suspicious. The scouts then rendezvoused with the main party and proceeded upriver. By midnight, April 17, the Loyalists had made it to the habitant shore of the post. To ensure no villagers or guards would be alerted by the approach, Colbert had the paddles of his vessels muffled with leather. Colbert landed his force slightly downriver from the village, leaving seven men to guard the canoes.

Battle
The battle began with an initial Loyalist raid of the village at about 2:30 a.m., resulting in an occupation by the attacking force. Although four families escaped the village and proceeded to seek shelter in nearby Fort Carlos III the attackers took most prisoner, including Luis de Villars and Alexo Pastor. Awakened by the commotion, the garrison launched a counter-attack, led by Jacobo du Breuil. During this engagement, the Spanish garrison sustained two losses and Pastor escaped from Loyalist captivity, reaching the fort in the chaos of battle. No other prisoners escaped during the fighting. Afterward, the Spanish garrison retreated to the fort, unmolested by Loyalist fire. 

At about 3:00 a.m., the attacking force began to entrench themselves in a ravine just outside the fort, which, due to its location among trees and bush, they could approach "within pistol shot". The two sides exchanged gunfire for six hours, with neither sustaining casualties because of both the strength of the fort's palisade walls and the attackers' entrenched position, which offered good shelter from the 4-pounder cannons that the defenders employed. At 9:00 a.m., Commander Dubrueil ordered Sergeant Pastor, nine soldiers, and four Quapaw warriors to prepare to make a sortie. Dubreil suspected that the attackers might be setting up artillery with which to breach the fort. At the same time, Colbert sent forth one of his officers under a flag of truce to deliver a peace offer demanding surrender. Marie Luisa Villars, the wife of the lieutenant and fellow prisoner, accompanied Colbert's officer to ensure he would not be shot approaching the fort. At this point, the exchange of gunfire ceased. Colbert's officer fled suddenly in fright, and Dubreuil received the peace offer, written by Colbert in French, from Madame Villars alone:

M. Le Capitaine Colbert is sent by his superiors to take the post of the Arkansas and by this power Sir, he demands that you capitulate. It is his plan to take it with all his forces, having already taken all the inhabitants, together with the Lieutenant Luis de Villars and his family.

Dubreuil refused to surrender, and ordered a sally. Sergeant Alexo Pastor and his force of 13 sallied out of the fort toward the 82 attackers, shouting Quapaw war cries. The apparent shock of this sally, mixed with war cries and volleys of musket fire, scattered the attacking force, which immediately retreated to the river and boarded the canoes with their prisoners. According to Dubreil, the Loyalist yelled "Let's go! Let's go! The Indians are upon us," as they fled. One attacker was killed in the retreat.

Aftermath
Following the rout, Colbert drove a tomahawk into the ground near the riverbank, symbolizing his intent to return, and had another message sent to Dubreil via one of the village inhabitants:

You can form an idea of my forces, at 12 today 500 Chickasaws are due to arrive and also two bateaux loaded with men, armed with four swivels and a cannon and if the Commandant of the fort does not surrender before the said hour and I am victorious, as I have no doubt I shall be, I do not know whether I can hold my people or not, and if the... [Quapaw] are used against us I myself will order the prisoners killed.

This message was ignored by Dubreil and the reinforcements mentioned by Colbert never materialized when Dubreil failed to surrender the fort. Chief Angaska arrived at the post at noon that day, and was scolded by Dubreil for his failure to send word about the approaching force. Angaska, after explaining the deception by Colbert's scouts, was sent with 100 Quapaw and 20 Spanish soldiers to recover the prisoners taken by the retreating Loyalists. On April 24, Angaska reached Colbert's flotilla near the mouth of the Arkansas River and proceeded to negotiate for the release of the prisoners. Bluffing that he had 250 men, Angaska convinced Colbert to release all but eight of his prisoners. Lieutenant de Villars and his wife were among those freed, but before being released, the lieutenant was allowed to sign an agreement securing the release of five Loyalist irregular arrested by the local Spanish government for rebellious activities in Natchez.

De Villars agreed to this under pain of re-imprisonment by Colbert or a fine, and the agreement was later fulfilled when the rebels were paroled on Villar's request. On May 5, Dubreil wrote to the Spanish governor of Louisiana, Esteban Rodríguez Miró, detailing the battle and praising the competence of his men. On May 16, Miró wrote to Colbert, informing him of the January 20 preliminary peace treaty between the two sides and requesting that all property and prisoners be returned unconditionally. Although the remaining prisoners were released, Colbert refused to return the property seized in the raid.

References

1783 in New Spain
Battle
Battles involving Great Britain
Battles of the Anglo-Spanish War (1779–1783)
Battle
Louisiana (New Spain)
Battle